Thioploca  is a genus of filamentous sulphur-oxidizing bacteria which occurs along  of coast off the west of South America. Was discovered in 1907 by R. Lauterborn classified as belonging to the order Thiotrichales, part of the Gammaproteobacteria. They inhabit as well marine as freshwater environments, with vast communities present off the Pacific coast of South America and other areas with a high organic matter sedimentation and bottom waters rich in nitrate and poor in oxygen. A large vacuole occupies more than 80% of their cellular volume and is used as a storage for nitrate. This nitrate is used for the sulphur oxidation, an important characteristic of the genus. Due to their unique size in diameters, ranging from 15-40 µm, they are considered part of the largest bacteria known. Because they use both sulfur and nitrogen compounds they may provide an important link between the nitrogen and sulphur cycles. They secrete a sheath of mucus which they use as a tunnel to travel between the sulfide containing sediment and the nitrate containing sea water.

Taxonomy and Identification 
The genus Thioploca was first described by German botanist R. Lauterborn in 1907, who discovered them in Lake Constance, Germany. Since this discovery, according to the NCBI database, a total of four species of Thioploca have been validly published: two freshwater species (Thioploca ingrica and Thioploca schmidlei) and two marine species (Thioploca araucae and Thioploca chileae).

The defining characteristic of Thioploca species is a filamentous morphology, aggregating into bundles enclosed within a polysaccharide sheath, with an either parallel or braided appearance. These bundles can reach several cm, making them easy to recognise. Occasionally they are also found as free-living trichomes, making them morphologically similar to the genus Beggiatoa. As Thioploca species also show a close phylogenetic affiliation to this genus and similar metabolic strategies, they are often mistaken as a species of Beggiatoa.

The four species are differentiated on the basis of their trichome diameters. The two marine species are unique in having diameters up to 43 µm (T. araucae 30-43 µm; T. chileae 12-20 µm), placing them amongst some of the largest prokaryotic structures. The freshwater species T. ingrica and T. schmidlei morphologically resemble the well characterised marine Thioploca species, but show a smaller trichome diameter. Although some morphological and phylogenetic differences have been found between marine and non-marine species, knowledge about freshwater and brackish Thioploca is still limited, as its ecology is poorly studied so far.

Cultivation 
The pure cultivation of Thioploca has so far not been successful. Natural populations can be kept alive for several months near the in-situ temperature of 13°C in anoxic seawater with added nitrate, but their need for a delicate balance of sulphide, nitrate and oxygen concentrations make an enrichment very difficult. Biochemical and physiological studies with harvested Thioploca filaments need to be handled carefully in order to avoid enzymatic activities due to air exposure.

Metabolism 

This particular genus shows interesting and not completely clarified metabolic pathways. This not well-known situation is due to the absence of no pure culture, but they seem to be mixotrophic sulphide oxidizers. Data in our hands are mainly recovered by several experiments conducted on entire communities or bundles of filaments. The hypothesis suggested by research of the possible nature of methylotrophs organisms was rejected, mainly because the areas in which they were found are not very rich in methane. Therefore, the small amount of methane concentration allows rejecting the possibilities of use of it for metabolic activity of a large population of these microorganisms. More specific research has shown that, through the use of 14C-labeled, they do not incorporate this specific compound or methanol. On the other hand, they showed incorporation capacity CO2 and different substrates (acetate, amino acids, bicarbonate, glucose, glycine, etc). For this reason, these microorganisms are considered a very good example of mixotrophic bacteria. Their basic strategy is based on the presence of trichomes, aggregates in bundles surrounded by a sheath, even if sometimes they are found as free-living trichomes.  They are basically defined as sulphur bacteria, capable of oxidizing mainly H2S (Hydrogen sulphide, etc.) and accumulating NO3 (Nitrate) in a specific vacuole in their cells. In the vacuole the concentrations of nitrate can increase up to 0.5 M. They have also shown the capacity to accumulate S0 (elemental sulphur) in the cells under the forms of drops, as a result of oxidation of hydrogen sulphide. These bacteria have developed this system (with morphological, physiological, and metabolic adaptation) to maintain a metabolism based on a different source of electron donor and acceptor, which are situated in a different zone in the water column and characterized by a different gradient.

Oxygen uptake and resistance 
These genera show a behavior typical of microaerophilic microorganisms. Data based on behavior and oxygen uptake experiment has confirmed their nature. They show an uptake rate of oxygen of 1760 µmol dm−3 h−1. Even if they show an uptake rate similar to Thiomargarita spp., they do not have the same capacities to resist for a longer time in presence of oxygen. For this reason, they populate OMZs (Oxygen Minimum Zone).

Sulphur metabolism 
Thioploca spp. has shown two types of response to sulphide based on its concentrations of it. They have a positive response to low sulphide (<100 µM) concentrations and negative to high concentrations. They show a maximum uptake rate at 200 µM. This coupled with taxis towards nitrate, regulates the behavior of this genus. Also involved in it is the  gradient of O2 affecting it in a minor way. For this reason, these microorganisms are defined as microaerophilic. Hypothetically they could be in competition with other sulphide oxidizing bacteria, but with the ability to accumulate nitrate they create a perfect strategy to access both electron donor and acceptor at the same moment.

Based on some research, we know that oxidized iron is important in process of scavenging H2S (hydrogen sulphide), although the precise mechanism is unknown. At the same time, the inhabited sheaths of Thioploca can be covered by filamentous sulphate-reducing bacteria. These sulphate-reducing bacteria, pertaining to the genus Desulfonema, could explain the high rate of recycling of H2S and its availability also in sulphide-pore environments.

Furthermore, the elemental sulphur accumulated in the cells as drops is involved in sulphur metabolism. This reaction is also involved oxygen which oxidates the elemental sulphur:

2S0+3O2+ 2H2O → 4SO42-+ 4H+

Another reaction, involving nitrate, is part of the oxidation:

4S0+3NO3−+ 7H2O → 4SO42-+ 3NH4++2H+

These two reactions occur at similar rates. A difference is situated in the uptake rate of sulphide that is 5-6 times faster with respect to the oxidation rate of elemental sulphur stored in the drops. Based on this we know that sulphide uptake is not coupled with carbon fixation.

Nitrogen metabolism 
Thioploca genus has shown also the capacity to accumulate nitrate and use the Dissimilatory nitrate reduction to ammonium (DNRA) pathway. To obtain nitrate they perform a vertical migration. Sheats of Thioploca spp. are considered a compatible niche for the growth of anammox bacteria, due to the ability of Thioploca spp. to perform Dissimilative nitrate reduction to ammonium. They are able to perform nitrite reduction and show positive taxis towards nitrite. The dissimilatory nitrate reduction is involved also in the oxidation of sulphide that leads to a higher accumulation of elemental sulphur. A higher presence and reduction of nitrate increase drastically the fixation of carbon dioxide (CO2). In any case, nitrate uptake can occur also in low environmental concentrations.

Species

Thioploca contains four species:
 Thioploca araucae
 Thioploca chileae
 Thioploca ingrica
 Thioploca schmidlei

Morphology 
Thioploca spp. can occur in both marine and freshwater environments, the difference between the two types being in the cell structure since the freshwater species are smaller.

These gram-negative bacteria can be described as flexible, univariate, colorless filaments made up of numerous cells and enclosed by a common gelatinous sheath. Their cell shape can vary in relation to the organism size. In small-sized organisms the cells are usually disk-shaped, while in bigger ones it is more common to find cylindrical or barrel-shaped cells.

The cells are famous for the presence of sulfur inclusions within the cytoplasm and their arrangement in the structure of the organism is characterized by the presence of separation cross-walls among them. Cells of large marine Thioploca look hollow because of the presence of the vacuole full of stored nitrate.

In marine species, the diameter of the trichome (filament) reaches lengths from 15 to 40 μm to many cm; according to their diameter they can be divided into different species. Nevertheless, only two are considered valid today: the 12-20 μm wide Thioploca Chileae and the 30-43 μm wide Thioploca araucae.

Thioploca typically grow in bundles surrounded by a common sheath and the number of filaments for sheath varies from a rage of ten to hundred. This sheath changes its shape during the growth. In young organisms it is thin and tough, while in adults it becomes wide and loose.

Each filament consists of a single row of cylindrical or barrel-shaped cells separated by a septum. In the latter ones, sulfur globules can be found and the cell wall has a complex, four-layered structure, of which the innermost layer and the cytoplasmic membrane go across the septum. Intracytoplasmic membranes and several cell inclusions form complex structures and their work is related to transport and storage.

Thioploca are organisms able to deposit sulfur granules, the most abundant being globules of  when sulphide is present. They are located externally of the cytoplasmic membrane, in particular in invaginations of it, and are therefore considered extracytoplasmic. This location has two important consequences:

 the diffusion of sulphide, that may not necessarily diffuse across the membrane to the cytoplasmic side. There it could undergo a disrupt metabolism, avoiding the toxic effects of sulphide ion
 the oxidation of sulphide on the external surface of the cytoplasmic membrane, creating the proton gradient for the synthesis of ATP.

Genetic information 
Based on the 16S rRNA sequences, Thioploca and Beggiatoa form a monophyletic, high diversified cluster belonging to Gammaproteobacteria. However, the distinction between Thioploca and Beggiatoa does not follow phylogenetic lines but follows the formation of the sheath around the filament bundle, a morphological characteristic. The 16S rRNA data supports the fact that T. araucae and T. chileae are two different species. Moreover, Thioploca species show some phenotypic similarities with some cyanobacteria (for example Microcoleus), because both have the formation of sheaths around bundles of filaments. Nonetheless, the phylogenetic data shows that there isn't any kind of relationship between sulphide-oxidizing bacteria and cyanobacteria, and are therefore defined as separate monophyletic bacterial groups.

Habitat 
The filamentous sulfur oxidizers Thioploca grows at oxic/anoxic interactions on freshwater, brackish and marine sediments where sulfide of biological and geothermal origin combines with oxygen or nitrate in the overlying water column.

Extensive rugs of Thioploca can be found on the Chilean and Peruvian continental shelf, where it grows on sediments that form the basis of deoxygenated water masses of the Peru-Chile countercurrent . Thioploca has been found in coastal regions with analogous upwelling regimes, where high organic productivity creates significant oxygen depletion at the bottom waters that covers organic-rich sediments with high sulfate reduction rates. Examples include the coast of Oman, and the Benguela current ecosystem off Namibia. Other reported marine habitats include the monsoon-driven upwelling area of the northwestern Arabian Sea  and hydrothermal vent sites in the eastern Mediterranean Sea.

Classical localities of the freshwater species are lakes in central and northern Europe, but they are also present in large lakes in North America, central Russia, and Japan.

Ecological niche 
By transporting nitrate intracellularly deep down into the anoxic seafloor, Thioploca appears to effectively eliminate the competition from other sulfide oxidizing bacteria, which are unable to store an electron acceptor for extended periods but need simultaneous access to both electron acceptor and donor in their immediate microenvironment. A similar storage of oxygen in the vacuoles would not be possible since the lipid membranes enclosing cells and vacuoles are permeable to gases. The thioplocas thus move up and down, recharging with nitrate at the surface and oxidizing sulfide at depth, therefore  storing elemental sulfur globules as an energy reserve.

Thioploca and Beggiatoa 
Although the thioplocas typically live in sheaths in bundles ranging from a few up to a hundred filaments per sheath, many were found at the sediment surface apparently without a sheath. At the Bay of Concepcion on the Chilean coast, there was a transition between an apparently pure Beggiatoa community inside the bay to a mixed community of both genera at the entrance of the bay to pure Thioploca outside. In the mixed community it was not possible to discriminate beggiatoas from thioplocas by simple microscopy but only by analyzing statistically their diameter distributions. The tapered ends of filaments, characteristic of Thioploca but absent in Beggiatoa, was not a consistent character of the thioplocas.

Future changes in classification of Thioploca and Beggiatoa are likely. The range of strains over which the genus designation Beggiatoa is used is overly broad. More importantly, the differentiation between Thioploca and Beggiatoa is currently based on the formation of a common sheath surrounding filament bundles, a characteristic that might vary in response to environmental conditions. In the absence of pure cultures, it may be impossible to prove or disprove whether any natural population of vacuolated Beggiatoa will form sheath bundles in some specific environment. The clade comprised three Thioploca strains, two Beggiatoa strains, and a Thiomargarita strain is united by the possession of a large central vacuole. This feature currently appears to be the best morphological candidate to replace sheath formation as a marker in a revised taxonomy of the group Beggiatoa–Thioploca. This marker, in addition to being consistent with 16S rRNA phylogeny, appears to be universally connected to intracellular nitrate accumulation, presumably in the vacuole, for nitrate respiration enabling sustained anaerobic metabolism. A future revision of the genus Thioploca, based on the vacuolated, nitrate-respiring phenotype and corresponding 16S rRNA clade, might include these gliding filaments regardless of whether they occur in sheathed bundles.

References

Thiotrichales